There have been 54 women in the Western Australian Legislative Council since its creation in 1832. Women have had the right to vote since 1899 and the right to stand as candidates since 1920.

The first successful female candidate for the Legislative Council was Ruby Hutchison, who was elected as one of the members for Metropolitan-Suburban Province in 1954, representing the Labor Party. Since then, women have been continuously represented in the Legislative Council; when Hutchison retired in 1971, she was succeeded by Lyla Elliott. Margaret McAleer became the first Liberal woman in the Council in 1974, and Winifred Piesse became the first Country Party woman in 1977.

In 1997, the first women representing minor parties were elected to the Council: Helen Hodgson for the Australian Democrats, and Chrissy Sharp and Giz Watson for the Greens WA.

List of women in the Western Australian Legislative Council

Names in bold indicate women who have been appointed as Ministers and Parliamentary Secretaries during their time in Parliament. Names in italics indicate entry into Parliament through a by-election or by appointment and * symbolises members that have sat as members in both the Legislative Council and the Legislative Assembly.

Timeline

See also

 
 
Western Australia